National Route 164 is a national highway of Japan connecting Port of Yokkaichi and Suwachō, Yokkaichi, Mie in Japan, with a total length of 3 km (1.86 mi).

History
National Route 164 was established by the Cabinet of Japan in 1953.

References

National highways in Japan
Roads in Mie Prefecture